Pablo Buendía Elvira (born 2 January 1986) is a Spanish footballer who plays for Atlético Tomelloso as a defender.

Club career
Born in Albacete, Castilla-La Mancha, Buendía graduated from Albacete Balompié's youth setup, and made his senior debuts with local the reserves in the 2005–06 campaign, in Tercera División. On 24 May 2008 he made his professional debut, starting in a 2–0 away win against CD Castellón.

In the 2010 summer Buendía moved abroad, joining Israeli Premier League side Hapoel Ramat Gan Giv'atayim F.C. In January 2011 he returned to his country, signing for UD Almansa, in the fourth level.

In the following years Buendía competed in Segunda División B but also in the fourth division, representing La Roda CF, Almansa and UD Socuéllamos. With the latter he achieved promotion at the end of the 2013–14 season, appearing in 30 matches and scoring once.

References

External links

1986 births
Living people
Sportspeople from Albacete
Spanish footballers
Footballers from Castilla–La Mancha
Association football defenders
Segunda División players
Segunda División B players
Tercera División players
Atlético Albacete players
Albacete Balompié players
Hapoel Ramat Gan F.C. players
Israeli Premier League players
Spanish expatriate footballers
Spanish expatriate sportspeople in Israel
Expatriate footballers in Israel
La Roda CF players